George Arthur Joseph Leonard (August 27, 1886 – August 21, 1917) was a Canadian professional ice hockey player. He played with the Quebec Bulldogs of the National Hockey Association and was with the Bulldogs when they won the 1912 Stanley Cup.

He died during combat in World War I.

References

1886 births
1917 deaths
Canadian ice hockey right wingers
Canadian military personnel killed in World War I
Ice hockey people from Quebec City
Quebec Bulldogs (NHA) players
Stanley Cup champions
Canadian military personnel from Quebec